Senator LaValle may refer to:

Gerald LaValle (1932–2018), Pennsylvania State Senate
Kenneth LaValle (born 1939), New York State Senate

See also
Gregory Lavelle (born 1963), Delaware State Senate